The 2013 1. deild karla (English: Men's First Division) is the 59th season of second-tier Icelandic football. Twelve teams will contest the league. The fixtures for the 2013 campaign were released by the KSÍ on 10 November 2012. Play began on 9 May and is scheduled to conclude on 21 September.

Teams
The league will be contested by twelve clubs, eight of which had played in the 2012 season. There were four new clubs from the previous campaign:
Grindavík and Selfoss were relegated from the 2012 Úrvalsdeild, replacing Þór A. and Víkingur Ó. who were promoted to the 2013 Úrvalsdeild
KF and Völsungur were promoted from the 2012 2. deild karla, in place of ÍR and Höttur who were relegated to the 2013 2. deild karla

Club information

League table

Results
Each team plays every opponent once home and away for a total of 22 matches per club, and 132 matches altogether.

Top goalscorers

References

1. deild karla (football) seasons
Iceland
Iceland
2